The following is a list of notable deaths in December 2004.

Entries for each day are listed alphabetically by surname. A typical entry lists information in the following sequence:
 Name, age, country of citizenship at birth, subsequent country of citizenship (if applicable), reason for notability, cause of death (if known), and reference.

December 2004

1
Fathi Arafat, 71, Palestinian physician, founder of the Palestinian Red Crescent Society, stomach cancer.
Prince Bernhard of Lippe-Biesterfeld, 93, Dutch royal, lung and colon cancer.
Norman Newell, 85, English record producer.
Damon Simonelli, 45, American planetary scientist, led pioneering studies in the exploration of the satellites of the Solar System with spacecraft.
David Vienneau, 53, Canadian journalist, pancreatic cancer.

2
Larry Buchanan, 81, American B-movie director, producer and writer, complications of collapsed lung.
Kevin Coyne, 60, English musician, filmmaker and author, pulmonary fibrosis.
Elizabeth Azcona Cranwell, 71, Argentine poet and translator.
Cachita Galán, 61, Argentine singer, cancer.
Dame Alicia Markova, 94, English ballerina.
Charles McLelland, 74, British radio executive.
Nadine Shamir, 32, American techno singer/songwriter, complications in childbirth.
Mona Van Duyn, 83, American poet, US Poet Laureate (1992), bone cancer.

3
Shiing-Shen Chern, 93, Chinese mathematician, heart failure following heart attack.
Gerald FitzGerald, 8th Duke of Leinster, 90, Irish nobleman.
Pavel Pavlov, 52, Bulgarian Olympic sprinter (men's 200 metres and men's 4 × 100 metres relay at the 1980 Summer Olympics).
Maria Perschy, 66, Austrian film, stage and TV actress, cancer.
Helmut Rix, 78, German linguist, car accident.
Josef Schwammberger, 92, German former Nazi labor camp commander.
Marek Stachowski, 68, Polish composer.

4
Carl Esmond, 102, Austrian film and stage actor.
Tom Fitzgerald, 53, American soccer coach (University of Tampa), injuries from motorcycle accident.
Elena Souliotis, 61, Greek operatic soprano, heart failure.
Matthew Troy, 75, American lawyer and politician, Parkinsons Disease.

5
Big Boy Henry, 83, American blues guitarist, singer and songwriter.
Seymour Ginsburg, 76, American computer scientist, Alzheimer's disease.
Neil Hallett, 80, Belgian-English actor.
Cristiano Júnior, 24, Brazilian footballer, cardiac arrest after on-field collision.
Jose Pellissery, 53/54, Indian film and theatre actor.
Hicham Zerouali, 27, Moroccan footballer, car accident.

6
Frank Reginald Carey, 92, British World War II fighter ace.
Raymond Goethals, 83, Belgian soccer coach.
Manzanita, 48, Spanish singer and guitarist.
Adrian Morris, 75, English painter.
John Norton, 86, American United States Army general.
Enrique Salinas, 52, Mexican businessman, asphyxiation.

7
Pacita Abad, 58, Filipino painter.
Frederick Fennell, 90, American conductor, founder of Eastman Wind Ensemble.
Floyd Nattrass, 86, Canadian Olympic sports shooter (men's trap shooting at the 1964 Summer Olympics).
Oscar M. Ruebhausen, 92, American prominent New York City lawyer, adviser to Governor Nelson A. Rockefeller and president of the New York City Bar Association.
Jerry Scoggins, 93, American musician ("The Ballad of Jed Clampett"), natural causes.
Jay Van Andel, 80, American co-founder and former chairman of Amway, Parkinson's disease.

8
Dimebag Darrell, 38, American heavy metal guitarist (Pantera, Damageplan), shot.
Cleve Gray, 86, American abstract painter.
Jackson Mac Low, 82, American poet, composer and performance artist, complications from stroke.
Leslie Scarman, Baron Scarman, 93, British jurist, Lord of Appeal in Ordinary (1977–1986).
Edgar Toppin, 76, American historian.

9
Henny Backus, 93, American actress.
David Brudnoy, 64, American radio talk show host (Boston), Merkel cell carcinoma.
Paul Edwards, 81, Austrian-born American philosopher.
Sir Peter Emery, 78, British Conservative politician (Honiton, 1967–1997; East Devon, 1997–2001).
Philippe Gigantès, 81, Canadian former senator, cancer.
Andrea Absolonová, 27, Czech diver and adult model known as Lea De Mae, brain cancer.
Sergey Voychenko, 49, Belarusian artist and designer.

10
Norman Borrett, 87, English sportsman.
Emilio Cruz, 66, Cuban-American artist, pancreatic cancer.
Bob King, 81, American college basketball coach.
Brian Ernest Maitland Prophet, 76, British civil servant.
Homi Wadia, 93, Indian film director and producer.
Gary Webb, 49, American investigative reporter ("Dark Alliance"), apparent suicide.

11
Christopher Blake, 55, English actor and screenwriter, Non-Hodgkin lymphoma.
Bum Bright, 84, American businessman and philanthropist.
José Luis Cuciuffo, 42, Argentinian footballer and 1986 Football World Cup champion, hunting accident.
Arthur Lydiard, 87, New Zealand marathon runner and athletics coach.
Harry Roesli, 53, Indonesian singer-songwriter, heart attack.
Margaret Fay Shaw, 101, American photographer and folklorist.
M. S. Subbulakshmi, 88, Indian Carnatic musician, heart irregularities.
Masao Yazawa, 89, Japanese Olympic sprinter.

12
Joseph Beyrle, 81, United States Army and Soviet Red Army soldier.
Antonio Paredes Candia, 81, Bolivian folklorist and writer.
Pramod Chakravorty, 75, Indian film producer and director.
Simon Combes, 64, British wildlife artist, gored by a buffalo.
Herbert Dreilich, 62, German rock musician, cancer.
George Ephgrave, 86, English footballer.
Rollin Hotchkiss, 93, American biochemist and molecular genetics pioneer.
Harry McNally, 68, English football player, coach and manager, heart attack.
Phaswane Mpe, 34, South African novelist, after short illness.
Fabian O'Dea, 86, Canadian lawyer and politician, Lieutenant Governor of Newfoundland and Labrador.
Syed Mir Qasim, 83, Indian politician, Chief Minister of Jammu and Kashmir (1971–1975).
William B. Rosson, 86, United States Army general, heart attack.
Bernarda Bryson Shahn, 101, American painter, lithographer, widow of Ben Shahn.
Pavlo Vasylyk, 78, Ukrainian Greek Catholic hierarch.

13
Donald S. Jones, 76, American admiral.
Andre Rodgers, 70, Bahamian baseball player, first Bahamian to play in Major League Baseball.
Tom Turesson, 62, Swedish footballer.
David Wheeler, 77, English computer scientist.

14
Harry Bowcott, 97, Welsh rugby union player (London Welsh, Wales) and president of the Welsh Rugby Union.
Candice Daly, 38, American film and TV actress (The Young and the Restless).
Danny Doyle, 87, American baseball player (Boston Red Sox).
Rod Kanehl, 70, American baseball player who hit the first grand slam in the New York Mets history, heart attack.
Alexey Korneyev, 65, Russian footballer.
Fernando Poe Jr., 65, Filipino actor and former presidential candidate, stroke.
Agostino Straulino, 90, Italian Olympic sailor (mixed two person keelboat: 1952 gold medal winner, 1956 silver medal winner).
Robert Watson, 81, American artist, cancer.

15
Chiang Fang-liang, 88, Russian-born widow of Chiang Ching-kuo and First Lady of the Republic of China on Taiwan (1978–1988), pulmonary and cardiac failure.
Harry Errington, 94, British firefighter, recipient of the George Cross.
Vassal Gadoengin, 61, Nauruan politician and then-incumbent Speaker of Parliament, heart attack.
Pauline LaFon Gore, 92, American lawyer.
Jiban Ghosh, 69, Indian cricket umpire.
Sidonie Goossens, 105, British harpist.
Jim Holliday, 55–56, American pornographic film producer and historian, complications from diabetes.
Rodney O'Gliasain Kennedy-Minott, 76, American diplomat, former United States Ambassador to Sweden, complications of pancreatitis.
Lorenzo "Larry" J. Ponza Jr., 86, American baseball pitching machine innovator, cancer-related illness.

16
Ted Abernathy, 71, American baseball player.
Laxmikant Berde, 50, Indian actor.
Richard B. Fisher, 68, American banker, cancer.
Stefano Madia, 49, Italian actor.
Agnes Martin, 92, American abstract painter, pneumonia.
Bobby Mattick, 89, American former baseball player and manager, stroke.
Yehudit Naot, 60, Israeli scientist and politician, throat cancer.
Lawrence D. O'Brien, 53, Canadian politician, member of the House of Commons of Canada, cancer.
Freddie Perren, 61, American two-time Grammy Award-winning record producer.
William Silverman, 87, American physician, known for making important contributions to neonatology.
Athena Starwoman, 59, Australian astrologer, breast cancer.

17
Dick Heckstall-Smith, 70, British saxophone player (Colosseum, John Mayall and the Bluesbreakers), cancer.
Ib Mossin, 71, Danish actor, singer and director.
Janina Niedźwiecka, 82, Polish film editor.
Tom Wesselmann, 73, American pop artist, following heart surgery.
Sir James Wilson, 83, British army general.

18
Noel Beaton, 78, Australian MP (Bendigo, 1960–1969) and journalist, after short illness.
John W. Downey, 77, American classical musician.
Vijay Hazare, 89, Indian cricketer, Captain of India (1951–1953), illness following intestinal cancer.
Albert Nordengen, 81, Norwegian Conservative politician, Mayor of Oslo (1976–1990), heart failure.
Anthony Sampson, 78, British journalist and author, official biographer of Nelson Mandela, heart attack.
Princess Takamatsu, 92, Japanese member of the imperial family, blood poisoning.
Glenn Vaughan, 60, American baseball player (Houston Colt .45s).

19
Michael Alexander, 84, British soldier and Prominente German Prisoner of War.
Gretchen Bender, 53, American video artist, cancer.
Richard Best, 88, British film editor.
Herbert C. Brown, 92, British Nobel Prize-winning chemist (Chemistry, 1979), heart attack.
Mel Gabler, 89, American conservative textbook critic, brain hemorrhage after fall.
Sir Charles Pereira, 91, British hydrologist, stroke.
Renata Tebaldi, 82, Italian opera singer, after short illness.
Thomas Yamamoto, 87, American artist.

20
Howard Feuer, 56, American casting director, colon cancer.
Ernő Gottesmann, 97, son of Ernő Gottesmann and Paula Manoilovich.
Liliane Maigné, 76, French actress.
Helge Pukema, 87, American football player.
Son Seals, 62, American blues musician, complications of diabetes.

21
Lennart Bernadotte, 95, Swedish prince.
Michael Forrest, Welsh television actor.
Richard Hamilton, 83, American actor (Men in Black, Pale Rider, Bret Maverick).
Jack Newfield, 66, American journalist (Village Voice, New York Daily News, New York Post), metastatic kidney cancer.
Mack Vickery, 66, American musician and songwriter, heart attack.
Zvonimir Vučković, 88, Yugoslav Chetnik military commander.

22
Yusuf Soalih Ajura, 114, Ghanaian Islamic scholar, political activist and sect leader.
Doug Ault, 54, American Major League Baseball player (Toronto Blue Jays), suicide by gunshot.
Pauline Clotworthy, 92, Irish teacher of fashion design.
Joseph Bennet Odunton, 83, Ghanaian public servant.
John Tiedtke, 97, American farmer, professor, businessman and philanthropist.

23
Richard Abel Smith, 71, British Army officer and landowner, stroke.
Reuven Adiv, 74, Israeli actor, director and drama teacher, heart attack.
Richard Barnet, 75, American political activist.
John W. Duarte, 85, British classical guitarist and writer, cancer.
Ifor James, 73, British horn player.
Roger Moorey, 67, British archaeologist and historian.
P. V. Narasimha Rao, 83, Indian Prime Minister (1991–1996), heart attack.
Anne Truitt, 83, American sculptor.

24
Capt. Richard Annand, 90, British soldier, first Victoria Cross recipient of World War II.
Sir Anthony Meyer, 84, British Conservative MP (West Flintshire, 1970–1983; Clwyd North-West, 1983–1992), cancer.
Johnny Oates, 58, American Major League Baseball catcher (Baltimore Orioles, New York Yankees) and manager (Baltimore Orioles, Texas Rangers), brain tumor.
Pete Palangio, 96, Canadian ice hockey player.
Dame Rosemary Rue, 76, British physician and civil servant.
Elwira Seroczynska, 73, Polish Olympic speed skater (silver medal winner in women's 1500 metres at the 1960 Winter Olympics).
Lauri Silvennoinen, 88, Finnish Olympic cross-country skier (1948 silver medal winner in men's 4 x 10 kilometre cross-country skiing relay).

25
Sandy Cameron, 66, Canadian politician.
Nripen Chakraborty, 99, Indian politician.
James Hunter Blair, 78, Scottish historic preservationist.
Jane Muskie, 77, American model and bookkeeper, widow of politician Edmund Muskie, Alzheimer's disease.
Donald Pederson, 79, American electrical engineer, complications from Parkinson's disease.
Antony Preston, 66, British naval historian and writer.
Eddie Spicer, 82, English footballer (Liverpool).
Gennady Strekalov, 64, Russian cosmonaut, Hero of the Soviet Union, cancer.

26
Sir Tristan Antico, 81, Australian businessman and arts patron.
Charles Biederman, 98, American abstract artist.
Jonathan Drummond-Webb, 45, South African paediatric heart surgeon, suicide by overdose.
Garard Green, 80, British actor.
Marianne Heiberg, 59, Norwegian diplomat, Oslo Accords mediator, heart attack.
Eddie Layton, 77, American organist (New York Yankees), after short illness.
David McKay, 83, Australian journalist and racing driver, cancer.
Don Nygord, 68, American Olympic sports shooter (50 metre 1984, 10 metre 1988, 50 metre 1988).
Sir Angus Ogilvy, 76, British businessman, husband of HRH Princess Alexandra, The Honourable Lady Ogilvy, throat cancer.
Frank Pantridge, 88, British physician and cardiologist.
Reggie White, 43, American football player (Philadelphia Eagles, Green Bay Packers) and member of the Pro Football Hall of Fame, cardiac arrhythmia.
Notable people killed in the 2004 Asian tsunami:
Jane Attenborough, 49, British arts administrator, daughter of actor Richard Attenborough
Troy Broadbridge, 24, Australian Football League player (Melbourne).
Kristina Fröjmark, 47, Swedish reality TV star.
Bhumi Jensen, 21, Thai prince.
Sujeewa Kamalasuriya, 39, Sri Lankan cricketer.
Sigurd Køhn, 45, Norwegian composer.
Markus Sandlund, 29, Swedish cellist.
Aki Sirkesalo, 42, Finnish musician.
Mieszko Talarczyk, 30, Swedish musician.
Robert Whymant, 60, British journalist (The Times) and author.

27
Eneko Arieta, 71, Spanish footballer.
Mabel Blythe, 74, Sri Lankan actress and singer.
Hank Garland, 74, American studio guitarist (Elvis Presley, Charlie Parker), staphylococcus infection.
Ernest Groth, 82, American baseball player (Cleveland Indians, Chicago White Sox).
Donald L. Hollowell, 87, American civil rights attorney, heart failure.
Heorhiy Kirpa, 58, Ukrainian industrialist and politician (Transport Minister since 2002), shot.

28
Jacques Dupuis, 81, Belgian Jesuit priest and theologian.
Jerry Orbach, 69, American actor (Law & Order, Beauty and the Beast, Dirty Dancing), Tony winner (1969), prostate cancer.
Johnny Pawk, 94, American basketball player.
Susan Sontag, 71, American author, literary theorist and activist, acute myeloid leukemia.
Tzvi Tzur, 81, Israeli officer.

29
Julius Axelrod, 92, American Nobel Prize-winning biochemist (Medicine, 1970), natural causes.
William Boyett, 77, American actor (Adam-12), complications from pneumonia and kidney failure.
John Bridgeman, 88, British sculptor.
Ken Burkhart, 89, American Major League Baseball pitcher and umpire, emphysema.
Arthur B. Chapman, 96, British-born American geneticist.
Liddy Holloway, 57, New Zealand actress (Shortland Street) and writer, liver cancer.
Gus Niarhos, 84, American baseball player (New York Yankees, Chicago White Sox, Boston Red Sox, Philadelphia Phillies).

30
Biswajit Das, 68, Indian playwright, short story writer, film director and script writer.
Mark Fiennes, 71, English photographer and illustrator.
Masao Kato, 57, Japanese go player.
Mary Tuthill Lindheim, 92, American sculptor and studio potter.
Meta Rosenberg, 89, American television producer and talent agent.
Artie Shaw, 94, American jazz musician, complications of diabetes.

31
M. E. H. Mohamed Ali, 77, Ceylonese politician.
Aladi Aruna, 71, Indian politician, murdered.
John Chataway, 57, Canadian politician, complications from stroke.
Charlie Cozart, 85, American baseball player (Boston Braves).
Gérard Debreu, 83, French-born American Nobel Prize-winning economist (Economics, 1983), natural causes.
Jack Karwales, 84, American football player.
Balkrishan Singh, 71, Indian Olympic field hockey player (gold medal winner in men's field hockey at the 1956 Summer Olympics).
George Wackenhut, 85, American businessman, founder of Wackenhut Corporation, heart failure.

References 

2004-12
 12